Keep Coming Back can refer to:

 Keep Coming Back (album), an album by Marc Broussard
 "Keep Coming Back" (song), a song by Richard Marx
 "Keep Coming Back", a song by Edie Brickell  & New Bohemians from Shooting Rubberbands at the Stars
 Keep Coming Back (film), a 2011 film with Jennifer Sciole

See also 
 I Keep Coming Back (disambiguation)